The 2017 FIBA Africa Champions Cup was the 32nd edition of the FIBA Africa Basketball Club Championship, the international basketball club tournament of FIBA Africa. The tournament was held in Radès, Tunisia from 11 to 20 December 2017.

The Association Sportive de Salé from Morocco won their maiden title, and their country's second title overall, by defeating Étoile de Radès of the host country, 77-69, in the Finals.

Qualifiers

Draw

Preliminary round
All times are local (UTC+1).

Group A

Group B

Final round

9th-12th Classification

11th Place

9th Place

RD3

5th-8th Classification

Semifinals

7th Place

5th Place

3rd Place

Final

Final ranking

Awards

All-Star Five

Statistics 
Statistics as of the ending of the season, including knock-out and classification games.

Individual statistical leaders

Individual game highs

References

 
FIBA Africa Clubs Champions Cup
2017 in African basketball
2017 in Tunisian sport
International basketball competitions hosted by Tunisia
FIBA Africa Clubs Champions Cup